Unguarded is the seventh studio album by Christian  and Pop singer Amy Grant, released in 1985 on A&M Records. It is Grant's first album released by A&M.

When Unguarded was released in 1985, Grant was perhaps the most popular star in contemporary Christian music, recording songs with religious lyrics in the pop/rock style of the day. With this album, however, the religious content of the lyrics was scaled back as compared with her two previous regular studio albums, Age to Age and Straight Ahead. The album track "I Love You" was Grant's first secular love song from her own pen. Despite this, the album's lead-off single, "Find a Way", was a number one hit on the Christian radio charts. Four other singles from the album were also Top Ten Christian radio hits.

The aggressive mainstream style of the songs on Unguarded, combined with a heavy promotional campaign on the part of the album's distributor in secular outlets, A&M Records, helped three of its singles reach the mainstream charts. "Find a Way" was a Top Ten hit on the Adult Contemporary chart and peaked at No. 29 on the Billboard Hot 100, while "Everywhere I Go" was a Top Thirty AC single and "Wise Up" was a minor charting single on the Hot 100. Unguarded would be certified gold in September 1985, and platinum in June 1986.

This was the final album to be recorded at Caribou Ranch, which was owned by former Chicago producer/manager James William Guercio before the infamous March 1985 fire that destroyed the studio's control room.

In 2007, Unguarded was reissued and digitally remastered by Grant's new record label, EMI/Sparrow Records. The remastered edition is labeled with a "Digitally Remastered" logo in the 'gutter' on the CD front.

On October 16, 2020, in celebration of the album's 35th anniversary, it was reissued on limited edition white vinyl, with the original 10-song album along with a bonus LP of live tracks and audio commentary from Grant, with an alternate album cover featuring all four of the W-O-R-D album covers. This version was later released digitally on October 30th, for streaming services only.

Track listing

Personnel 

 Amy Grant – lead vocals, backing vocals (2, 3)
 Robbie Buchanan – Roland Jupiter 8 (1), synthesizers (1, 4–7, 10), synthesizer bass (1), sound effects (4), drum programming (4), synthesizer programming (5), Yamaha DX7 (8), acoustic piano (10), track arrangement (10)
 Shane Keister – synthesizers (1, 7, 9), acoustic piano (1), explosion (2), synthesizer programming (3), Yamaha GS1 (3, 8), Fender Rhodes (5), Memorymoog (6), Fairlight (8)
 Michael W. Smith – Yamaha GS2 (2, 3, 8), Memorymoog (3)
 Larry Williams – synthesizer (7), saxophone (7)
 Dann Huff – electric guitars (1-10), guitar solo (4, 5)
 Jon Goin – electric guitars (2, 3, 4, 6, 8, 9), acoustic guitar (10)
 Michael Landau – electric guitars (2, 4, 7, 9), guitar solo (10)
 Paul Jackson Jr. – electric guitars (7)
 Mike Brignardello – bass (2–9)
 Paul Leim – drums (1, 2, 3, 5–10), drum programming (4), drum overdubs (4), LinnDrum programming (7)
 Lenny Castro – percussion (2, 6, 8, 10)
 Bill Champlin – backing vocals (1, 7)
 Gary Chapman – backing vocals (1, 3, 6, 8)
 Tommy Funderburk – backing vocals (1, 2, 6, 7)
 Diana Hanna – backing vocals (1, 3, 8)
 Chris Harris – screams (1), backing vocals (8)
 Gary Pigg – screams (1), backing vocals (8)
 Kathy Burdick – screams (1)
 Tom Kelly – backing vocals (2 ,4, 6, 9)
 Steve George – backing vocals (4, 9)
 Richard Page – backing vocals (4, 9)
 Chris Eaton – backing vocals (5)
 Kim Fleming – backing vocals (8)
 Donna McElroy – backing vocals (8)

Production 

 Brown Bannister – producer
 Michael Blanton – executive producer
 Dan Harrell – executive producer
 Gary Chapman – executive producer
 Jack Joseph Puig – engineer, mixing
 Kevin Burns – assistant engineer
 Steven Ford – assistant engineer
 Dan Garcia – assistant engineer
 Alan Henry – assistant engineer
 J.T. – assistant engineer
 Richard Markowitz – assistant engineer
 Mike Ross – assistant engineer
 Clark Schleicher – assistant engineer
 Doug Sax – mastering at The Mastering Lab (Los Angeles, California)
 Kent Hunter – art direction, design
 Mark Tucker – photography
 Julie Miller – stylist

Album cover

To further heighten Grant's visual appeal, A&M released Unguarded with four different covers, respectively labeled W, O, R, and D. When the album was issued on compact disc, the 'D' variation became the standard version for the cover.

Charts

Weekly charts

Year-end charts

End-of-decade charts

Certifications

Awards
GMA Dove Awards

Grammy Awards

References

External links 
 Unguarded: 25 Years (1985-2010) at chonnie.com

Amy Grant albums
1985 albums
Albums produced by Brown Bannister
A&M Records albums
Myrrh Records albums